Amun Abdullahi or Amun Abdullahi Mohammed (born October 23, 1974) is a Somali-Swedish journalist and founder of a girls' school in Mogadishu, Somalia.

Biography 
Amun Abdullahi grew up in Somalia and came in the 1990s to Sweden as a refugee. In Sweden, she lived first in Umeå, then Stockholm's Rinkeby district, and finally  Kista, before moving back to Mogadishu, Somalia.

In Stockholm, she worked for SR International, and made several high-profile reports broadcast on Sveriges Radio. Among other things, she revealed in 2009 that a leader of a youth center in Rinkeby recruited young people to the Somali Islamist militia al-Shabab.

She has been both physically and intellectually attacked and repeatedly threatened due to her work. She claims that Sweden is "more dangerous than Mogadishu" for a journalist who wants to tell the truth.

Awards 
 2010: Swedish Publicists' Association Freedom of Speech prize in memory of Anna Politkovskaya.

References 

1974 births
Living people
Swedish journalists
Swedish people of Somali descent
Swedish women journalists
Swedish columnists
Somalian journalists
Somalian women journalists
Swedish women columnists
Somalian women columnists